Assaad Seif  (born 23 September 1967) is a Lebanese archaeologist and Associate Professor in Archaeology at the Lebanese University. Former Head of the Scientific Departments and coordinator of archaeological research and excavations in Lebanon, at the Directorate General of Antiquities in Beirut.

Biography

Educated at the College Mont La Salle in Ain Saadeh, Seif drove a red cross ambulance during the Lebanese Civil War and took shelter in the National Museum of Beirut when under attack in 1990. In that year he studied for a Bachelor of Arts in Arts and Archaeology at the Lebanese University, Faculty of Human Sciences Section II - Fanar, where in 1995 he was awarded a Master of Arts in Archaeology with a thesis entitled "Catalogue and analysis of the collection of Pre-classic pottery belonging to Walid Jumblatt in the Museum of Beit ed-dîne". He was awarded his PhD in Archaeology from the University of Paris 1 Pantheon-Sorbonne in 2010 for a work entitled "The Spatial Dynamics and the Pottery of the Syro-Palestinian Corridor from the Neolithic to the Middle Bronze Age : The Case of the ʿAkkār". The thesis intended to propose a new approach to the study of the settlement patterns of the ʿAkkār. It aimed to explain the cultural relations of this territory with its regional entourage as well as the interaction between Man and environment in the southern part of the plain from the Neolithic to the Middle Bronze II. The research was structured around three major research axis. The first dealt with the analysis of the ceramic material surveyed in the southern part of the plain in 1997 and 1999 in order to learn the technological, cultural and chronological aspects of this material. Through the parallels, it also aimed to sketch a model of the cultural contacts throughout the region. The second focused on the palaeo-environmental data in order to understand the paleoclimate of the region in general, and the plain in particular with its geomorphology during the mentioned periods. The third axis, based on the use of Geographic Information Systems (GIS), focused on the archaeology of the landscape taking into account the spatial dimension of the plain to better understand the interactions between the sites and their territory.

Upon a special request from the head of the Landscape Archaeology Department (Dr. Sander Van Der Leeuw) at the Sorbonne, he taught MA students in GIS applications in archaeology in 1999. It involved instructing the theories and methods of landscape archaeology applications through the use of GIS and individually instructing participants in the use of the software and how to apply GIS analysis algorithms to data sets prepared during the courses. He has worked on numerous excavations and was scientific director of more than twenty urban excavations mainly around Beirut. He has coordinated and assisted many scientific research projects in specialist fields such as Archaeo-seismology and Geoarchaeology in North Lebanon, along with collaborations with the UNESCO office in Beirut and the DGA.

During his work at the DGA, Seif has coordinated many scientific research projects in collaboration with the Lebanese National Center for Scientific Research (CNRSL) and also directed other research projects dealing with geophysical surveys and heritage management. Lately he has coordinated a project focused on the preventive conservation of Baalbek site and monuments through the use of new technologies, mainly laser scanning, in the aim to develop an integrated risk preparedness strategy for the site. He has two assistant professor positions in two universities, teaching a "History of Architecture" course at NDU (College Notre Dame De Louaize - Zouk Mosbeh) Architecture Department. He also teaches "pottery technology" and "history of the archaeological research in Lebanon" courses at the Lebanese University Archaeology Department.

Professional Affiliations

Assaad Seif has been an Honorary Senior Research Associate in the Institute of Archaeology, University College London since September 2010 and a Member of American Schools of Oriental Research since February 2010.  He is also a member of the Editorial Advisory Board of CMAS, a British publication dealing with the conservation and management of archaeological sites.  He has also been a member of ICOM since 2004. Between 1998 and 2000 he was a member of the CAA (Computer Applications in Archaeology) Steering Committee and between 1998 and 1999 a member of the CCD-Lebanon (Committee for Combating Desertifcation) under the auspices of the Ministry of Agriculture.

Career

Since May 1996, Seif has been an archaeologist at the Directorate General of Antiquities (DGA) within the Lebanese Ministry of Culture. Between 1999 and 2000 (August 1999 - February 2000) he was acting General Director of the DGA. In January 2007 he was appointed Director and coordinator of the archaeological excavations and research projects in Lebanon (Ministry of Culture, DGA). During 2004 he was Director of the Geophysical Surveying Unit at the Ministry of Culture, DGA and since 2003 was Heritage Management Director and coordinator of the archaeological excavations of the Beirut city center. In 2003 he became Coordinator of the IT training of the DGA personnel and between 2002 and 2008 was put in charge of the automation project of the DGA (in collaboration with Office of the Minister of State for Administrative Reform (Lebanon)). Since 2001 he has been responsible for the GIS Archaeological Map of Lebanon and Coordinator of the Archaeological Map of Tyre. Between 2001–2003, he was Coordinator of the CEDRE project on behalf of the Directorate General of Antiquities. In 2000 he became a member of the committee designated by the Prime Minister for restructuring the Directorate General of Antiquities. Between April 1999 and February 2000 he was also in charge of the international archaeological missions in the DGA. In 1999 he was Cultural Heritage specialist representing Lebanon during the Twenty-third session of the UNESCO World Heritage Bureau (10 July 1999) and the 3rd extraordinary session of the UNESCO World Heritage Committee in Paris UNESCO headquarters (12 July 1999). In 1999 he became a member of the Committee designated by the Minister of Culture for the preparation of 14 September UNESCO Day in Byblos. In 1999 he was a member of the Committee designated by the Minister of Culture for the evaluation of the historic buildings in Beirut. Also in 1999 he was delegated by the Minister of Culture to represent the DGA in the Delft University of Technology workshop on a Byblos Heritage Management plan with the Collaboration of UNESCO World Heritage Center. Between 1997 and 1998 he was appointed Regional Co-director of the Heritage Management section in South Lebanon and between 1996 and 1997 as Regional Co-director of the Heritage Management section in North Lebanon at the Ministry of Culture, DGA.

Conservation Skills and Experience

In 2005, Assaad Seif worked on a consultancy mission for the Qatar Islamic Museum project, commissioned by the Qatar Cultural Authority. Between 1992 and 1994 he was Site Director for the restoration of the iconostasis of the church "l'Eglise de la Mère de Dieu" at the Balamand Monastery (North Lebanon), in collaboration with Samir Rbeiz, architect and restorer in charge of the project. From 1991 to 1993 he was involved in restoration of ceramics at Tell Kazel. From 1986 to 1991 he was Assistant Conservator of Cultural Property (Paintings, Icones, frescoes, mosaics, pottery, stone, etc.), with Elie Abboud, previous chief of the section of restoration works at the Directorate General of Antiquities.

Teaching Experience

In 2011, Seif taught History of Architecture I (From Prehistory to the end of the Hellenistic Period) at NDU, Louaizé Architecture Department in the Spring 2011 Semester and Pottery in Archaeology at the Lebanese University, Faculty of Human Sciences IV, Archaeology Department along with Pottery Technology at the Faculty of Human Sciences II, Archaeology Department. In 1999 he taught GIS applications in Landscape Archaeology as a Teaching Assistant in two seminars organized for graduate students at the University of Paris I and researchers in archaeology at the CNRS - Montpellier – France, in collaboration with Dr. Zoran Stancic.

Bibliography

Between 1994 and 1998, Seif engaged in preparation of several computer generated maps for the Ministry of Tourism (Lebanon) (published in several brochures edited by the Ministry of Tourism). From 2004 until 2007 he undertook map drawing, text compilation, English translation and edition of fourteen tourist brochures concerning major heritage sites in Lebanon: Baalbek, Tyre, Sidon, Tripoli, Beit eddine.

References

External links
 Maney Publishing - Publications by Assad Seif

Lebanese archaeologists
University of Paris alumni
Living people
1967 births